The 2012 AFL season is the Gold Coast Suns' second season in the Australian Football League (AFL). The Gold Coast Suns reserves team also competed in the NEAFL.

Draft picks 

 The mini-draft allowed teams to pre-list players for the following season.

Transactions

Overview

Trades

Delistings
Delstings made in November 2011

2012 playing list

Pre-season results

NAB Cup

Home and Away season

Results Summary

Home and Away games

Ladder

Ladder Progress

Awards

Brownlow Medal

Gold Coast Club Champion

Other Awards

NEAFL season

Results

Ladder

References

External links 

Gold Coast Suns
Gold Coast Suns seasons